Callinicus is a genus of robber flies in the family Asilidae. There are about five described species in Callinicus.

Species
These five species belong to the genus Callinicus:
 Callinicus calcaneus Loew, 1872 i c g b
 Callinicus pictitarsis (Bigot, 1878) i c g b
 Callinicus pollenius (Cole, 1919) i c g b
 Callinicus quadrinotatus (Bigot, 1878) i c g
 Callinicus vittatus Wilcox, 1936 i c g
Data sources: i = ITIS, c = Catalogue of Life, g = GBIF, b = Bugguide.net

References

Further reading

External links

 
 
 

Asilidae genera
Articles created by Qbugbot